The North of Ireland Cricket Club (often referred to simply as North or by the abbreviation N.I.C.C. was a cricket club in Belfast, Northern Ireland.

At the end of the 2001 season, the club, along with its sister rugby club, merged with Collegians R.F.C., Collegians Hockey Club and the Belfast Bowling Club to form Belfast Harlequins, based at Deramore. This involved leaving its historic home on the Ormeau Road (one of the earliest international sports venues in Ireland) after a series of sectarian arson attacks, including the burning of its pavilion. The club, with a mainly Protestant membership, was perceived as being "isolated in a zone of working-class nationalism".

The Collegians Cricket Club had previously merged with Cooke Cricket Club to form Cooke Collegians Cricket Club, so the Belfast Harlequins cricket club was effectively a continuation of North. In 2004, however, dissatisfied with the Deramore pitch and the inability to attract new players, the cricket section of Belfast Harlequins folded and merged instead with Civil Service Cricket Club to form the Civil Service & North of Ireland Cricket Club, playing its first season in 2005.

Honours
Irish Senior Cup: 1
1982
NCU Senior League: 20 (5 shared)
1899, 1900, 1902, 1903, 1904, 1905, 1907, 1908, 1923, 1940, 1946, 1954, 1957, 1960, 1961, 1963 (shared), 1965, 1971 (shared), 1986 (shared), 1987, 1990 (shared)
NCU Challenge Cup: 20
1889, 1900, 1901, 1902, 1903, 1904, 1906, 1907, 1910, 1912, 1925, 1938, 1951, 1956, 1960, 1969, 1980, 1982, 1990, 1999
NCU Junior Cup: 15 (1 shared)
†1898, †1900, †1901, †1905, †1907, †1913, †1921, †1937, †1949, †1956 (shared), †1957, †1972, †1979, †1994, †1996

† Won by 2nd XI

References

Sports clubs in Belfast
Defunct cricket clubs in Ireland
1859 establishments in Ireland
2001 disestablishments in Northern Ireland